The Risbyle Runestones are two runestones found near the western shore of Lake Vallentunasjön in Uppland, Sweden, dating from the Viking Age.

Description

The Risbyle Runestones, listed in the Rundata catalog as U 160 and U 161, were engraved in Old Norse with the Younger Futhark in the early 11th century by the Viking Ulf of Borresta (Báristaðir) who had partaken three times in the danegeld in England and raised the runestone U 336 in the same region. They were raised in memory of Ulf of Borresta's kinsman-by-marriage Ulf in Skolhamarr (Skålhammar).

One of the runestones, U 161, has the Eastern cross which shows the influence of Byzantine culture on Sweden at this time through the Varangians who returned after having served the Emperor in Constantinople (see also the Greece Runestones and the Italy Runestones). The cross is today the coat-of-arms  of Täby Municipality. Both runestones are in the style Pr1, and they have a pronounced Ringerike character. 

The Skålhamra clan who asked Ulf of Borresta to make the runestones also had another couple of runestones made at Arkils tingstad across the lake, in addition to the runestone U 100 at a path in the forest.

U 160

This runestone was raised after Ulfr of Skolhamarr by his children Ulfke(ti)ll, Gýi and Un(n)i. The runemaster is considered to be Ulfr of Báristaðir himself. The Norse word salu for soul in the prayer was imported from English and is first recorded during the tenth century.

Transliteration of the runes into Latin characters
ulfkitil * uk * kui uk + uni + þiʀ × litu * rhisa × stin þina * iftiʀ * ulf * faþur * sin * kuþan on * buki * i skul(o)bri * kuþ * ilbi * ons * at * uk * salu * uk * kusþ muþiʀ * li anum lus * uk baratis

Transcription into Old Norse
Ulfkætill ok Gyi ok Uni/Unni þæiʀ letu ræisa stæin þenna æftiʀ Ulf, faður sinn goðan. Hann byggi i Skulhambri. Guð hialpi hans and ok salu ok Guðs moðiʀ, le hanum lius ok paradis.

Translation in English
Ulfketill and Gýi and Uni/Unni, they had this stone raised in memory of Ulfr, their good father. He lived in Skolhamarr. May God and God's mother help his spirit and soul; grant him light and paradise.

U 161

This runestone was made by Ulfr of Báristaðir in memory of Ulfr in Skolhamarr, his kinsman-by-marriage, on the request of the latter Ulf's son Ulfke(ti)ll. The design of the inscription is very similar to that of U 226 at Arkils tingstad except that two crosses have been added in the area enclosed by the two serpents.

Transliteration of the runes into Latin characters
ulfʀ * iuk i barstam * iftiʀ * ulf * i skulobri * mak * sin * kuþan * ulfkil lit akua

Transcription into Old Norse
Ulfʀ hiogg i Baristam æftiʀ Ulf i Skulhambri, mag sinn goðan. Ulfkell let haggva.

Translation in English
Ulfr of Báristaðir cut (the stone) in memory of Ulfr in Skolhamarr, his good kinsman-by-marriage. Ulfkell had (it) cut.

See also
History of Sweden
Norrtil Runestones

Notes

Sources
Rundata
The article 5. Runriket - Risbyle on the website of the Stockholm County Museum, retrieved July 7, 2007.

External links
 An English Dictionary of Runic Inscriptions of the Younger Futhark, at the university of Nottingham

Runestones in Uppland